The Poltava electoral district was a constituency created for the 1917 Russian Constituent Assembly election.

The electoral district covered the Poltava Governorate. Poltava was an agrarian province. Voter turnout was reported at 74%.

The Russian SRs (dominated by the left) ran a joint list with the Ukrainian SRs (also dominated by its leftist faction). The Selianska Spilka ('Village Union'), the agrarian wing of the Ukrainian SRs, confronted the Farmers (Landowners) Party, excluding Landowners from local election commissions. The campaign against the Landowners Party occasionally took a violent shape.

The lists of the Folkspartey and the Jewish National Electoral Committee formed an electoral bloc, likewise the Poalei Zion and the United Socialist Jewish Workers Party lists formed an electoral bloc. Three minor Ukrainian lists formed an electoral bloc: the Ukrainian Social Democrats and the Ukrainian Socialist-Federalists and the Ukrainian National Republican Group.

Results

References

Electoral districts of the Russian Constituent Assembly election, 1917
1910s elections in Ukraine